Roland Jaccard (22 September 1941 – 20 September 2021) was a Swiss writer, journalist, and literary critic.

References 

1941 births
2021 deaths
2021 suicides
People from Lausanne
Swiss male writers
Male journalists
Swiss literary critics
Le Monde writers
University of Lausanne alumni
Drug-related suicides in France
20th-century Swiss journalists
21st-century Swiss journalists
20th-century male writers
21st-century male writers